Caledonia is an unincorporated community in Union County, Arkansas, United States.

History
John L. Canley (1938-2022), United States Marine Corps Sergeant Major and recipient of the Medal of Honor, was born in Caledonia.

Notes

Unincorporated communities in Union County, Arkansas
Unincorporated communities in Arkansas